Carrie Snowden was one of the twenty founders of Alpha Kappa Alpha Sorority, Incorporated, the first sorority founded by African-American women. It was important for supporting women in college, career and community life in a segregated society. Her legacy in creating and participating in the sorority was an organization that has generated social capital for nearly 100 years.

Early life
Snowden was born in Washington, D.C. to parents who encouraged her pursuit of education. Prepared by public schools, she was admitted to Howard University, the top historically black college in the nation. Only 1/3 of 1% of African Americans and 5% of whites attended any college in the early part of the century.

Howard University and Alpha Kappa Alpha
Snowden attended Howard University, where she and fifteen other individuals initiated Alpha Kappa Alpha on January 15, 1908. She served as the epistoleus (corresponding secretary) of the Alpha chapter. She graduated with a B.A. degree in 1910, having studied English, French, German, and history.

In 1923 Snowden was a charter member for Xi Omega, the alumnae chapter established in Washington, DC.  She was active on the membership and amenities committees for more than 20 years, and helped expand the organization.

Career
Snowden worked in later years in administration at Howard University as a switchboard operator.  This enabled her easily to take classes there. She pursued lifelong learning, taking courses at Howard in a wide range of subjects such as geography, science, commerce, economics, social work and mathematics later in life.

Snowden died in 1948.

References

External links
Carrie Snowden, Alpha Kappa Alpha

1948 deaths
Alpha Kappa Alpha founders
Howard University alumni
People from Washington, D.C.
Year of birth missing